Kostja Ullmann (born May 30, 1984) is a German actor, best known for his leading role in the award-winning coming of age drama Sommersturm (Summer Storm) which gained a lot of praise throughout Europe.

Life and career
Ullmann was born in Hamburg to a German father and an Indian mother. He entered the stage at the age of eleven and performed at Hamburg's Ernst Deutsch Theater and Winterhuder Fährhaus. In 1998, he made his TV debut in a minor part in the crime series Alphateam.

In the following years, Ullmann starred in several minor roles in TV series such as Stahlnetz, Großstadtrevier, and Leipzig Homicide as well as in TV movies such as the drama Albtraum einer Ehe (2001) alongside August Zirner. From 1999 to 2000, he was a cast member of the comedy series Zwei Männer am Herd with Wolfgang Fierek and Florian Fitz.

In 2004, Kostja Ullmann made his movie debut in a leading role in Marco Kreuzpaintner's award-winning film Sommersturm (Summer Storm). His performance in the romantic TV drama Heimliche Liebe about the relationship of a schoolboy and an older woman won Ullmann the Günther-Strack-Fernsehpreis as Best Actor in 2006.

In his second movie,  (2006), Ullmann stars in a similar role. Directed by Angelina Maccarone, he plays a young delinquent who engages in an "amour fou" with his probation officer who is more than 30 years older than he is. The film won a Golden Leopard at the 2006 Locarno International Film Festival. He acted as Hermann Lake in German-Japan collaborated movie Baruto no Gakuen (Ode an die Freude) in 2006.

Ullmann played the lead role, Luca Behrendt, in the 2008 movie Die Zeit, die man Leben nennt.

Ullmann will voice Wirt in the German dub of Over the Garden Wall.

Filmography

External links
 

German male television actors
1984 births
Living people
Male actors from Hamburg
German male film actors
German male child actors
German people of Indian descent
20th-century German male actors
21st-century German male actors